Garcia João dos Santos Domingos (born 12 May 1971 in Luanda) is a former Angolan basketball player. He competed at the 2000 Summer Olympics with the Angola national basketball team.

References

External links
 

1971 births
Living people
Angolan men's basketball players
Basketball players at the 2000 Summer Olympics
Olympic basketball players of Angola
Basketball players from Luanda
Point guards
C.D. Primeiro de Agosto men's basketball players
1994 FIBA World Championship players